Marta Roure i Besolí (born 16 January 1981) is an Andorran singer and actress. She represented Andorra in the Eurovision Song Contest 2004 with her song "Jugarem a estimar-nos", earning the eighteenth place in the semifinal. It was the first time a song in Catalan language was performed at the Eurovision Song Contest, as well as Andorra's debut at the competition.

Early and personal life 
She was born on 16 January 1981 in Andorra la Vella, Andorra, into a music family. Her great-grandfather, Joan Roure i Riu, was a trumpeter, her grandfather Joan Roure i Jané a sardana was a composer, her aunt Meritxell Roure i Morist has been a piano teacher, and her father Jordi Roure i Torra a band director, trumpeter and trumpet teacher. Marta has a sister, Anna, who is a piano teacher. She was born in Andorra, but she spent her youth in France.

Marta is the mother of a boy born in 2002 and called Julen.

Musical career 
Marta Roure attended until 4th course of Sol-fa and 3rd of piano at the Conservatoire of Andorra. She attended first course of guitar and song at the Music School in Lleida and studies of musical theater at Youkali school in Barcelona, with Marc Montserrat, "el Sueco" and Susanna Egea as  teachers of interpretation, Emma Reverter as teacher of Dance Jazz, Rosa Mateu in spoken voice technics, Enric Torner as teacher of claque, Josep Maria Borràs teacher of sol-fa and repertoire, and Fulgenci Mestres and Carme Sánchez teachers of song. She also attended an intensive course of commedia dell'arte with Ester Cort at the "Col·legi de Teatre" in Barcelona.

Before she worked as a technical of health in Andorra la Vella, but during 19 years can she relate with dance, the sportive and rhythmical gymnastics and the "esbart dansaire". She has been in Barcelona under the theatrical orders of Joan Ollé interpreting the work of Choral "theater Romput". She has done small collaborations in written press and in Ràdio Principat and Ràdio Estel. At present she lives in Andorra, is studying Juridical Sciences, and is the voice of "De Bar en Bar" and also collaborates in concerts of other formations.

In 2004, Roure was chosen to represent Andorra in the Eurovision Song Contest 2004 with her song "Jugarem a estimar-nos", following a programme on the Andorra Televisió. It was the first time Andorra competed at the Eurovision Song Contest, and the first time a song in Catalan language was performed at the competition. Eventually, Roure earned twelve points and placed the eighteenth in the semifinal, and did not advance to the final. Shortly after, on 8 November 2004, she released her debut album Nua (Catalan: Naked).

Discography

Studio albums 
2004 — Nua

Singles 
2004 — "Jugarem a estimar-nos"

See also 
Andorra in the Eurovision Song Contest
Andorra in the Eurovision Song Contest 2004
Eurovision Song Contest 2004

References

External links

1981 births
Eurovision Song Contest entrants for Andorra
Andorran women singers
Andorran actresses
Catalan-language singers
Eurovision Song Contest entrants of 2004
Living people
People from Andorra la Vella
21st-century women singers
Música Global artists